Neuroleon is a large and complex genus of antlions in the subfamily Myrmeleontinae. There are more than 150 described species from Europe, Asia and Africa, and there are many undescribed taxa. Where the biology of the larvae is known, they live freely in sand or in sheltered rock crevices.

Species
Species list from Catalogue of Life:

 Neuroleon adspersus
 Neuroleon aegaeus
 Neuroleon aguilari
 Neuroleon alexandrei
 Neuroleon amseli
 Neuroleon antii
 Neuroleon apicalis
 Neuroleon arenarius
 Neuroleon argutus
 Neuroleon asirensis
 Neuroleon assimilis
 Neuroleon basilineatus
 Neuroleon basutinus
 Neuroleon belohensis
 Neuroleon braunsi
 Neuroleon bronzii
 Neuroleon caligatus
 Neuroleon canariensis
 Neuroleon chloranthe
 Neuroleon clignyi
 Neuroleon confusus
 Neuroleon congolanus
 Neuroleon crosi
 Neuroleon dancalicus
 Neuroleon danieli
 Neuroleon deceptor
 Neuroleon decoratus
 Neuroleon delicatus
 Neuroleon demeter
 Neuroleon dianae
 Neuroleon diffusus
 Neuroleon distichus
 Neuroleon distinctus
 Neuroleon drosimus
 Neuroleon ducorpsi
 Neuroleon egenus
 Neuroleon erato
 Neuroleon fanaticus
 Neuroleon festai
 Neuroleon gracilis
 Neuroleon gratus
 Neuroleon guernei
 Neuroleon guptaii
 Neuroleon guttatus
 Neuroleon hieraticus
 Neuroleon hyalinus
 Neuroleon imperator
 Neuroleon indistinctus
 Neuroleon infidus
 Neuroleon infirmus
 Neuroleon inspersus
 Neuroleon jucundus
 Neuroleon junior
 Neuroleon laglaizinus
 Neuroleon laniger
 Neuroleon laufferi
 Neuroleon lepidus
 Neuroleon leptaleus
 Neuroleon lesnei
 Neuroleon linarixius
 Neuroleon loangeinus
 Neuroleon lodwarinus
 Neuroleon longipennis
 Neuroleon lugubris
 Neuroleon lukhtanovi
 Neuroleon macilentus
 Neuroleon marcopolo
 Neuroleon maroccanus
 Neuroleon mavromustakisi
 Neuroleon microstenus
 Neuroleon modestus
 Neuroleon mozambicus
 Neuroleon muzanus
 Neuroleon nemausiensis
 Neuroleon nigericus
 Neuroleon nigriventris
 Neuroleon nubilatus
 Neuroleon nubilus
 Neuroleon ochreatus
 Neuroleon pallidus
 Neuroleon pardalice
 Neuroleon parvus
 Neuroleon pauliani
 Neuroleon podagricus
 Neuroleon polyzonus
 Neuroleon pulchellus
 Neuroleon punctatus
 Neuroleon punjabensis
 Neuroleon quadripunctatus
 Neuroleon regnieri
 Neuroleon retialis
 Neuroleon reticulatus
 Neuroleon roscidus
 Neuroleon sansibaricus
 Neuroleon serrandi
 Neuroleon seyrigi
 Neuroleon signatus
 Neuroleon sociorus
 Neuroleon socotranus
 Neuroleon stenopterus
 Neuroleon striatellus
 Neuroleon striatus
 Neuroleon striolatus
 Neuroleon striolus
 Neuroleon syrus
 Neuroleon taifensis
 Neuroleon telosensis
 Neuroleon tenellus
 Neuroleon tibestinus
 Neuroleon torridus
 Neuroleon tristichus
 Neuroleon tristictus
 Neuroleon uniformis
 Neuroleon unpunctatus
 Neuroleon waterloti
 Neuroleon villosus
 Neuroleon virgineus
 Neuroleon zakharenkoi

References

Myrmeleontidae genera
Myrmeleontinae